Stranger Than Fiction is a 2000 comedy-thriller film directed by Eric Bross and starring Mackenzie Astin.

Plot

While waiting for their flight in a bar of an airport, the writer Donovan Miller tells the story of his best-seller to a stranger to kill time. In Salt Lake City; Violet Madison, Austin Walker, Emma Scarlett and Jared Roth are good friends. After going together to a bar, Jared comes wounded to Austin's apartment in the late night and confesses that he is gay and has just killed a man in his apartment. He asks his friends to help him to vanish with the body of the victim. The group agrees, and after many incidents, Violet stresses, jeopardizing the group. When Violet is found, having hanged herself in her house, many secrets are disclosed.

Cast
 Mackenzie Astin as Jared Roth
 Todd Field as Austin Walker / Donovan Miller
 Dina Meyer as Emma Scarlett
 Natasha Gregson Wagner as Violet Madison
 Michael Flynn as Nick
 Steve O'Neill as Porter
 Scott Subiono as Homeless man
 Joe Unger as Bubba
 Frances Bay as Mrs. Steiner
 Robert Lewis as Policeman #1
 K.C. Clyde as Young Man
 Sharron Prince as Newscaster

Reception
On Rotten Tomatoes the film has an approval rating of 38% based on reviews from eight critics.

References

External links
 

2000 films
American thriller films
Films directed by Eric Bross
Films produced by Ram Bergman
2000s thriller films
2000s English-language films
2000s American films